Brunnadern is a village in the municipality of Neckertal in the Wahlkreis (constituency) of Toggenburg in the canton of St. Gallen in Switzerland.

Brunnadern was an independent municipality until January 1, 2009, when it merged with Mogelsberg and St. Peterzell to form the municipality of Neckertal.

See also
 Brunnadern-Neckertal railway station

References

External links
 Official website 
 

Former municipalities of the canton of St. Gallen